The fifth series of Ross Kemp: Extreme World, BAFTA-winning documentary maker Ross Kemp and his Extreme World team return to reveal the human stories behind the world's toughest issues.

Production
Filming for the fifth series was announced via Kemp's Twitter account; it began in September 2015 before Kemp took a break during the Christmas season. Filming continued in April 2016 after Kemp had finished filming his brief return for BBC One's EastEnders.

The fifth series was made up of six 60 minutes episodes and aired from July to October 2016.

Episodes

Ratings

References

Ross Kemp: Extreme World
2016 British television seasons